Hydnellum lundellii is a species of tooth fungus in the family Bankeraceae. Found in Europe, it was described as new to science in 1969 by mycologists Rudolph Arnold Maas Geesteranus and John Axel Nannfeldt.

References

External links
 

Fungi described in 1969
Fungi of Europe
lundellii